This is a list of motor vehicle deaths in Thailand by year.  54% of motor vehicles in Thailand were two or three-wheeled vehicles. These vehicles were involved in 73% of fatalities. A fatality is defined as a death within 30 days of a crash. There were 212,060 km of roads in 2006: 61,747 km of highways, 313 km of motorways, 42,500 km of rural roads, and 107,500 km of local roads under local administration.

Deaths by year

See also
Department of Rural Roads
List of countries by traffic-related death rate
List of motor vehicle deaths in Iceland by year
Thai highway network

References

External links
 Study reveals shocking extent of dangerous driving 

Deaths in Thailand by year
Transport in Thailand
Motor vehicle deaths by year
Motor vehicle deaths by year
Thailand